Benfleet Football Club is a football club based in Benfleet, Essex, England.

History
The club was established in 1922, and were initially named Benfleet United. After merging with Parkfields Athletic, they were renamed Benfleet Rangers. The club played in the Southend & District League and won the Essex Junior Cup in 1967–68. After winning the league title in 1971–72, the club joined the Essex Olympian League and dropped the Rangers part of the name. They were runners-up in their first two seasons in the league. In 1981 the league gained a second division, with Benfleet becoming members of Division One. They were league runners-up again in 1981–82, before the league was renamed the Essex Intermediate League in 1986. The club were subsequently champions and Essex Intermediate Cup winners in 1988–89.

In 1995–96 Benfleet finished second-from-bottom of Division One and were relegated to Division Two. They won the Essex Premier Cup in 2002–03. The league reverted to its original name in 2005, and the club were Division Two champions in 2006–07, earning promotion to the renamed Premier Division. After three seasons in the Premier Division, they were relegated back to Division One at the end of the 2009–10 season. The 2013–14 season ended with them being relegated to Division Two, and the club resigned from the league midway through the following season.

Benfleet then re-entered the Essex Olympian League in Division Three for the 2015–16 season, going on to win the division and secure promotion to Division Two. At the end of the 2017–18 season the club successfully applied for promotion to the new Division One South of the Eastern Counties League, a three-division jump.

Ground
The club originally played at the Recreation Ground in Benfleet. When they moved up to the Eastern Counties League, the first team began a groundshare at Canvey Island's Park Lane. The remainder of the club's teams remained at Woodside Park in Benfleet.

Honours
Essex Olympian League
Champions 1988–89
Division Two champions 2006–07
Division Three champions 2015–16
Senior Cup winners 1983–84
Senior Challenge Cup winners 1974–75 (shared), 1982–83, 1984–85, 1989–90 (shared)
Denny King Memorial Cup winners 2001–02, 2002–03
Southend & District League
Champions 1971–72
Essex Premier Cup
Winners 2002–03
Essex Intermediate Cup
Winners 1988–89
Essex Junior Cup
Winners 1967–68

See also
Benfleet F.C. players

References

External links

Football clubs in England
Football clubs in Essex
1922 establishments in England
Association football clubs established in 1922
Essex Olympian Football League
Eastern Counties Football League
Mid-Essex Football League